Karla Mayer, born Karla Woellert (born 7 February 1918), was a guard at three Nazi death camps during the Second World War. Mayer's whereabouts after 1944 are unknown.

Background
Woellert was born in Friedland, Germany. On 15 September 1941, she arrived at Ravensbrück to undergo guard training. In March 1942, she arrived at Auschwitz I camp in Poland. There she gained the title of Leiterin eines Sortierkommandos ("Chief Overseer of a Sorting Party").

Disappearance
Mayer later went to the Majdanek camp near Lublin, and when Majdanek was evacuated in early 1944, she arrived back at Auschwitz, and then disappeared. Her fate is unknown.

See also
List of people who disappeared

References

1918 births
1940s missing person cases
Auschwitz concentration camp personnel
Female guards in Nazi concentration camps
Missing in action of World War II
Missing people
Missing person cases in Germany